Shane Hudella is an American politician serving in the Minnesota House of Representatives since 2023. A member of the Minnesota Republican Party, Hudella represents District 41B in the southeast Twin Cities metropolitan area, which includes the cities of Hastings and Cottage Grove and parts of Dakota and Washington Counties.

Early life, education and career 
Hudella graduated from Hastings High School. He joined the Minnesota Army National Guard in 1988, serving until 2012. Hudella was deployed in Operation Desert Storm in Iraq, and reached the rank of First Sergeant.

Minnesota House of Representatives 
Hudella was first elected to the Minnesota House of Representatives in 2022, after redistricting and the retirement of Republican incumbent Tony Jurgens. Hudella serves on the Education Finance, Transportation Finance and Policy, and Veterans and Military Affairs Finance and Policy Committees.

Electoral history

Personal life 
Hudella lives in Hastings, Minnesota with his wife, Jessica, and has four children.

References

External links 

Members of the Minnesota House of Representatives
Year of birth missing (living people)
Living people
People from Hastings, Minnesota
University of St. Thomas (Minnesota) alumni
United States Army personnel of the Gulf War